The Secretary of State for Canada, established in 1867 with a corresponding department, was a Canadian Cabinet position that served as the official channel of communication between the Dominion of Canada and the Imperial government in London.

As Canada became increasingly independent after World War I, and particularly with the passage of the Statute of Westminster in 1931, this role fell into disuse. The department was maintained, however, and was used to administer various aspects of government that did not have their own ministry. Accordingly, the Secretary of State for Canada was Registrar General of Canada, responsible as such for the Great Seal of Canada and various functions of state associated with it.

At various times the Secretary of State for Canada was responsible for the Royal Canadian Mounted Police, the civil service, the Queen's Printer for Canada, administration of Crown lands, and governance of Canadian Indians (as they were called at the time), as well as various ceremonial and state duties. Generally, any government role and responsibility which was not specifically assigned to a cabinet minister would be the de facto responsibility of the Secretary of State.

The department was eliminated in 1993 when the government was reorganized; however, the position of Secretary of State for Canada was not legally eliminated until 1996 when its remaining responsibilities were assigned to other cabinet positions and departments, particularly the newly created Minister of Canadian Heritage position.

The position of Secretary of State for Canada had no relation to that of Secretary of State for External Affairs except for the period from 1909 until 1912 when the Secretary of State for Canada (Charles Murphy under Sir Wilfrid Laurier, and William James Roche under Sir Robert Borden) was responsible for the newly created Department of External Affairs.

Secretaries of State for Canada

See also

 Secretary of State for the Provinces - post preceding the Minister of Interior
 Minister of the Interior

References 

Canadian ministers